Zhang Yuqi (born May 8, 2002), also known as Rachel Zhang, is a Chinese singer-songwriter. In 2013, she participated in the Children's Singing Program of Hunan Television "Let's Sing Kids" and received attention. In 2019, she won the championship in the Tencent Video music talent show "The Coming One Girls" (also known as "The Coming One 3").

Life and career
On May 8, 2001, Yuqi was born in Huangshi, Hubei, China. She learned singing, composing and dancing at an early age. In 2009, she moved to Wuhan, studied at Wuhan Experimental Foreign Language School and joined the school chorus. In 2011, she got the first place in the city's campus personal performance of red song singing. In October 2012, she participated in the " Rolling Stone 30" concert in Wuhan Station with the school chorus, and sang the opening song "Happy Paradise". Since then, Zhang Yuqi began to accept regular vocal training.

In 2013, she participated in the Children's Singing Program of Hunan Television "Let's Sing Kids" (first season), and joined the Hu Haiquan (Chinese singer) class, won the name of "a musical nuclear weapon". After the program, her performance received a lot of attention. Her video was posted on Sina Weibo and was once ranked fourth in the platform. On August 18 of the same year, she participated in the 2013 Daweishan (Hunan Province) summer festival camping music season "Cartoon Night" with another student of "Let's Sing Kids". In 2014, Zhang Yuqi and some of the participants of the season formed a "Let's Sing Kids (first season)" combination, and released on August 8 of that year—the first EP "New Sound Class one".
In the same year, she participated in the "Let's Sing Kids" (Second Season), and joined the Shang Wenjie class. On September 20, Zhang Yuqi, Pan Yunqi and Lv Xingyang of " Let's Sing Kids 2" participated in the closing ceremony of the Golden Eagle Cartoon Maiji Children's Art Festival. On November 14, 2015, together with Pan Yunqi and Golden Eagle Cartoon "Flying Family", she participated in the Hunan Southern Special Joy World "Fangte Night • Mango FAN" Carnival Carnival.

On January 22, 2016, Zhang joined the 2016 "Chinese Culture Paradise" Excellent Talent Student Exchange Group hosted by Overseas Chinese Affairs Office and went to Australia in mid-February. On May 1, she participated in the "To Sing for Love" Super Children's Star Charity Concert National Tour Changsha Station; on the 28th, participated in the "Children's Dreams" Super Children's Charity Concert National Tour Foshan Station. On June 18, part of the "Let's Sing Kids" participants participated in Ningxiang Lushan Maisheng Music Carnival. On July 17, she participated in the Hunan IPTV parent-child singing program "The whole family sang children's songs" finals. On October 1, participants of the "Let's Sing Kids " participated in the 2016 Maiji Music Festival.

On January 2, 2017, she participated in the "Singing for Love" Super Child Singer Public Welfare Concert National Tour Wuhan Station. In the same year, she graduated from Yingge Middle School in Wuhan. And studied in an international school in Beijing and received the qualification of Berklee College of Music in the following year. In June 2019 She joined in the Tencent Video music talent show "The Coming One Girls" (also named "The Coming One 3") as a "Restart" track entrant. And finally on August 24, with 4.07 million points of support to win the title of "the strongest label" for the season (i.e., the champion).
On October 31, 2019, Yuqi won the Future Shock Award of Freshasia Music Festival. She attended the 2020 Breakthrough Prize ceremony at NASA's Ames Research Center on November 3, 2019, in Mountain View, California, and sang her own song "Outside" for the ceremony.

Discography

Let's Sing Kids (first season) 
 Studio album

Singles

The Coming One Girls (The Coming One 3) 
Singles

Television shows

Let's Sing Kids

The Coming One Girls (The Coming One 3)

Other shows

References

External links 
 

2002 births
Living people
Chinese women singer-songwriters
People from Huangshi
Singers from Hubei
21st-century Chinese women singers